Jordi Dalmau Nieves (born 21 May 1989) is a Grand Prix motorcycle racer from Spain.

Career statistics

By season

Races by year

References

External links
 Profile on motogp.com

Living people
Spanish motorcycle racers
Motorcycle racers from Catalonia
1989 births
125cc World Championship riders
Sportspeople from Barcelona